Echeuetheis was a village in ancient Arcadia, in the territory of Tegea, and one of the nine townships into which ancient Tegea was divided.

References

Populated places in ancient Arcadia
Former populated places in Greece
Lost ancient cities and towns